Éternelle is a French television miniseries. It was produced by Alizés Film (France) in a format of six episodes of 52 minutes, directed by Didier Delaître. It stars Claire Keim and was broadcast for the first time on M6 between July 30, 2009 and August 13, 2009 on prime time.

Plot summary
On a rainy night, Yann Voline, a night doctor, crashes his SUV into a young woman in the nude. She is carried to the hospital, she has lost memory and is infected by an unknown bacteria. She quickly refuses to be separated from the man who injured her, and she is a complete mystery for everybody, medical personnel and police. Yann discovers that she has strange powers such as mind reading, and she can exchange personality, memories and abilities with the people she meets. She has also a kind of Sumerian birthmark on her left thigh.

Cast
 Claire Keim : « She »
 Guillaume Cramoisan : Yann Voline
 Boris Terral : Christophe Morel
 Antoine Duléry : Lieutenant Gir
 Audrey Fleurot : Svetlana Jankova
 Serge Riaboukine : Shakin
 Arthur Jugnot : Martin
 Elsa Mollien : Karine
 Asil Rais : Ikshan

Reception and distribution
The series was quite successful in France. It gathered 4 million viewers on the first night (19,6% market share), which is good in France for science fiction on prime time television. For the following episodes, the audience settled down at 2.5 million. The second season is in progress of writing.

The series is available on DVD in France.

External links

See also
 List of French television series

2000s French drama television series
French science fiction television series
2009 French television series debuts
2009 French television series endings